Hollywood-Monster (working title - released as Ghost Chase in the United States) is a 1987 horror comedy film directed by Roland Emmerich, about a film crew working in a haunted mansion. Emmerich's third film, it starred Jason Lively, Jill Whitlow, Paul Gleason, Chuck Mitchell, and Tim McDaniel.

A co-production between West Germany and the United States, the film was released theatrically in Germany on June 25, 1987. It would eventually be released on video cassette in the United States on February 7, 1990, by M.C.E.G. Virgin Home Entertainment. In 2001, the film was released on DVD by Image Entertainment.

Plot
Two cousins, Fred and Warren, live together in Hollywood. Fred, an aspiring horror-movie director with developed skills in SFX and animatronics, desperately tries to shoot his first movie in their house, but Warren, who plays the main male protagonist, keeps on flirting with Laurie, the main actress. When she can't stand it anymore, the project is over, and the bills are pilling up.

Out of the blue, Warren is called out to the reading of his grandfather's will and testament. The boys end up with an old clock, inhabited with the spirit of Louis, Warren's grandfather's deformed butler. The benevolent spirit, having appeared to Fred in the night, as well as showing him a flashback of the day he and Warren's grandfather Karl died, which Karl poisoned himself, and sealing himself in the basement with all his money to prevent his family from getting any, and unfortunately the butler dies falling down stairs. The dream inspires Fred in making a new script for which he builds an animatronic version of the butler, whose spirit inhabits.

The butler and the boys will help each other as they face a new problem: the son of Warren's grandfather's partner who managed to swindle Warren's family out of their property, Producer Stan Gordon, who wants the grandfather's heritage to be kept secret, and try to get Fred's new movie made. It will all end in a race against the clock in an old house basement, and a fight against a demented ghost armor, as the movie pays homage to the late 50-to-70's Sci Fi B movies.

Cast
Jason Lively as Warren McCloud 
Tim McDaniel as Fred
Jill Whitlow as Laurie Sanders
Leonard Lansink as Karl
Paul Gleason as Stan Gordon
Ian MacNaughton as Frederick McCloud
Chuck Mitchell as Mr. Rosenbaum
Julian Curry as Lawyer
Cynthia Frost as Secretary
Andreas Kovac-Zemen as Pawn Shop Owner
Toby Kaye as Laurie's Girlfriend
Larry Pennell as Bum 
Ernie Lively as Production Manager

References

External links

1988 films
Films directed by Roland Emmerich
1980s comedy horror films
Films set in Los Angeles
1987 comedy films
1987 films
1988 comedy films
1980s English-language films
English-language German films